The 30th New Brunswick Legislative Assembly represented New Brunswick between March 23, 1899, and February 5, 1903.

Abner Reid McClelan served as Lieutenant-Governor of New Brunswick until January 1902 when he was succeeded by Jabez Bunting Snowball.

C.W. Robinson was chosen as speaker.

The Liberal Party led by Henry Emmerson formed the government. Lemuel John Tweedie became party leader in 1907 when Emmerson entered federal politics.

History

Members 

Notes:

References 
 Canadian Parliamentary Guide, 1901, AJ Magurn

Terms of the New Brunswick Legislature
1899 establishments in New Brunswick
1903 disestablishments in New Brunswick
19th century in New Brunswick
20th century in New Brunswick